The Billings-Hougaard House, at 75 E. 300 North, off U.S. Route 89 in Manti, Utah, was built around 1855.  It was listed on the National Register of Historic Places in 1980.

It has a rear T-extension. The house is built of high quality adobe bricks laid in common bond. It has Greek Revival style characteristics, in its proportions, its shallow pitch of roof, its half-height upper windows, and its cornice returns at gable ends.

It was deemed significant as "significant as an excellent example of Utah folk/vernacular design and because it is one of the best surviving unsheathed adobe homes in the state."

It was built by Alfred Billings and was bought in 1863 by Rasmus Hougaard (1806-1875), a wealthy arriving immigrant farmer from Virkel, Falster, Denmark.

It is located on the northwest corner of E. 300 North and N. 100 East.

References

National Register of Historic Places in Sanpete County, Utah
Greek Revival architecture in Utah
Houses completed in 1855